The Espinhaço Mountains are a mountain range in Brazil. It forms the divide between the upper watershed of the São Francisco River and those of the shorter rivers which flow east into the Atlantic Ocean, including the Doce, the Jequitinhonha, and the Pardo rivers. The historical town of Diamantina is located in the Espinhaço Mountains. The Espinhaço Mountains were a major route through which Minas Gerais was settled during the Gold Rush of the 18th century.

References

Mountain ranges of Brazil
Biosphere reserves of Brazil